Douglas Edward Reeman (15 October 1924 – 23 January 2017), who also used the pseudonym Alexander Kent, was a British author who wrote many historical novels about the Royal Navy, mainly set during either World War II or the Napoleonic Wars. He wrote a total of 68 novels, selling 34 million copies in twenty languages.

Biography
Reeman was born in Thames Ditton, Surrey, son of Charles "Percy" and Ada Reeman.

At the beginning of the Second World War he joined the Royal Navy's boys' training establishment HMS Ganges. In 1940 Reeman was appointed Midshipman, at the age of 16. His initial service was in destroyers on convoy duty in the North Atlantic. During this time his ship was sunk and Reeman was injured by exploding depth charges. Later he transferred to Motor Torpedo Boats and was present subsequently at D-Day in a landing craft. It was then that he was injured badly when his landing craft was hit by shellfire. He finished the war in Kiel repairing damage to make the port usable again, with the rank of Lieutenant.

After the war, Reeman joined the Metropolitan Police, serving as a beat officer and later in the Criminal investigation department. At the beginning of the Korean War he rejoined the Navy. At the end of the war he joined London County Council as a child welfare officer, but remained a Lieutenant-Commander in the Royal Naval Reserve.

Novels
Reeman's debut novel, A Prayer for the Ship, was published in 1958. Reeman is most famous for his series of Napoleonic naval stories, the main character of which is Richard Bolitho, and, later, his nephew, Adam Bolitho. Reeman also wrote a series of novels about several generations of the fictional Blackwood family who served in the Royal Marines from the 1850s to the 1970s, and a non-fiction account of his own Second World War experiences, D-Day: A Personal Reminiscence (1984). He used the pseudonym Alexander Kent (the real name of a friend and naval officer who died during the Second World War) for his Bolitho novels and his real name for his other novels and non-fiction.

Teacher and advisor
In addition to being an author, Reeman also taught navigation for yachting and served as a technical advisor for movies.

Personal life
Reeman was married twice; first to Winifred Melville, and later, after he was widowed, to Canadian author Kimberley Jordan in 1985.

Bibliography (with publication dates)

World War II novels

The Blackwood Saga
aka The Royal Marines Saga
 Badge of Glory (1982) (1st in plot sequence)
 The First to Land (1984) (2nd)
 The Horizon (1993) (3rd)
 Dust on the Sea (1999) (4th)
 Knife Edge (2004) (5th)

Other settings
 High Water (1959)
 Send a Gunboat (1960)
 The Hostile Shore (1962)
 The Last Raider (1963)
 Path of the Storm (1966)
 The Deep Silence (1967)
 The Greatest Enemy (1970)

The Bolitho novels

Richard Bolitho novels
(using the name Alexander Kent)

Adam Bolitho novels
n.b. these follow directly the Richard Bolitho novels
 Second to None (1999)
 Relentless Pursuit (2001)
 Man of War (2003)
 Heart of Oak (2007)
 In the King's Name (2011)

References

External links

 Douglas Reeman official site

1924 births
2017 deaths
Military personnel from Surrey
People from Thames Ditton
English writers
English historical novelists
Royal Navy officers of World War II
Nautical historical novelists
Royal Navy personnel of the Korean War
Metropolitan Police officers
English social workers
Royal Naval Volunteer Reserve personnel of World War II
Royal Naval Reserve personnel